Terry Newton (7 November 1978 – 26 September 2010) was an English professional rugby league footballer who played in the 1990s and 2000s. He played at representative level for Great Britain, England and Lancashire, and at club level for the Leeds Rhinos (Heritage No. 1278), the Wigan Warriors (Heritage No. 931), Bradford Bulls (Heritage No. ) and Wakefield Trinity Wildcats (Heritage No. 1275), and was one of a handful of players to feature in each of the first 15 seasons of Super League. In February 2010, he was given a two-year ban after being one of the first sportsmen to have tested positive for human growth hormone. He was found hanged in his home seven months later.

Playing career

Leeds Rhinos
Newton joined the Leeds Rhinos after a protracted transfer from amateur team Wigan St Judes, after Warrington had claimed they had also signed the young Newton. Terry missed his first year of Academy rugby due to the problem however when he finally joined in March 1996 he made an immediate impact. He made his début for the Leeds Rhinos against the Sheffield Eagles at Headingley in April 1996 and by 1997's Super League II, he was a regular in the team making 26 appearances in 1997 and scoring 2-tries. His progression continued in 1998, despite going on loan to Bramley for a month, he still played in the Grand Final team at Old Trafford before playing arguably his best season at the club in 1999. The Leeds Rhinos had signed Great Britain  Lee Jackson, and Newton's opportunities looked limited, however coach Graham Murray came up with a game plan that used both to their maximum potential. Newton, with his no nonsense direct play would start games with Jackson coming on off the bench to carve teams open. Newton gained two caps in the 1998 Great Britain v New Zealand test series whilst at Leeds Rhinos. Newton won international honours with two caps for England against France in October 1999. He played 83 times for Leeds Rhinos and scored 6-tries.

Wigan Warriors
Newton joined the Wigan Warriors, and he made his début on Boxing Day 1999 against St. Helens. He was a prolific try scorer for the Wigan Warriors, scoring over a dozen tries in each of his first two seasons. He played for England in 2001 against Wales. Terry would surely have represented Great Britain in the 2001 Ashes series had it not been for a broken arm suffered in the Wigan Grand Final defeat by Bradford Bulls at Old Trafford. Newton signed a 4-year extension to his Wigan Warriors contract during August 2002. Newton won caps for Great Britain while at the Wigan Warriors in 2002 against Australia (sub), in 2003 against Australia (3 matches), in 2004 against Australia (3 matches), and New Zealand. He played much of the 2003's Super League VIII despite needing a knee operation. He decided to put the operation back to the end of the year because the club was suffering an injury crisis at the time. He was rewarded for his efforts when he was included in the 2003 Super League 'Dream Team'. He made his return to the Great Britain squad for the 2003 Ashes series, despite needing a knee operation. Newton was selected in the Great Britain team to compete in the end of season 2004 Rugby League Tri-Nations tournament. At the Wigan Warriors, Newton featured in three Super League Grand Finals, and was on the losing side on each occasion.

Bradford Bulls
Newton moved to the Bradford Bulls for the start of the 2006 season as part of a swap deal involving Mickey Higham. While at the Bradford Bulls he played for Great Britain in 2006 against New Zealand (2 matches), New Zealand (sub), and Australia (2 matches), and in 2007 against New Zealand. He was a consistent performer for the Bradford Bulls, but the club did not feature in a major final during his time there. He was allowed to leave the club following the expiry of his contract at the end of the 2009 season. Newton signed for Wakefield Trinity Wildcats following the expiry of his contract at the Bradford Bulls.

Wakefield Trinity Wildcats
On 22 February 2010 Newton was banned for two years by the UK Anti-Doping Agency (UKAD) after failing a drug test on 24 November 2009. He was just two games into a 2-year deal that he had signed with Wakefield Trinity Wildcats, but the contract was cancelled. The father of two young girls became a pub licensee following his ban.

Death
On 26 September 2010, Newton was found hanged in a house on Harswell Close in the Orrell district of Wigan. A later post mortem found traces of cocaine, amphetamines and the steroid nandrolone within his system, prescription anti-depressants, and consumption of alcohol, all of which could have impaired his judgement. Newton had left several notes stating he wanted to die. Coroner Jennifer Leeming recorded an open verdict.

Statistics

Club career

Representative career

References

External links
Statistics at wigan.rlfans.com
(archived by web.archive.org) Bradford profile
(archived by web.archive.org) 2001 Ashes profile
Newton looking to hit Hull early

1978 births
2010 deaths
2010 suicides
Bradford Bulls players
Bramley RLFC players
Doping cases in rugby league
England national rugby league team players
English rugby league players
English sportspeople in doping cases
Great Britain national rugby league team players
Lancashire rugby league team players
Leeds Rhinos players
Rugby league hookers
Rugby league players from Wigan
Suicides by hanging in England
Wakefield Trinity players
Wigan Warriors players